"Think About Me" is a song by British-American rock band Fleetwood Mac, released in March 1980. The song was composed by Fleetwood Mac keyboardist Christine McVie. "Think About Me" and "Not That Funny" were the first "Tusk" singles released in their remixed form.

The song peaked at number 20 on the US Billboard Hot 100 singles chart and number 24 on Canada's RPM Top 100 Singles chart.

Even though "Think About Me" was a Top 20 hit, it was not included in the 1988 album Greatest Hits but was included in the 2002 album The Very Best of Fleetwood Mac. Fleetwood Mac played the song for the first time live in over 25 years for their Australian leg of the "On with the Show tour" in Sydney. Christine McVie introduced the song in a more humorous fashion; “It was released as a single, although I don’t think it did do terribly well. But we like it.”

Canadian indie rock band The New Pornographers recorded a cover version of the song for the 2012 compilation album Just Tell Me That You Want Me: A Tribute to Fleetwood Mac. The version features backward-sounding guitars and Carl Newman on lead vocals.

Reception 
In 1979, Ed Harrison of Billboard called the song "a more rocking, guitar punctuated tune backed with superb harmonies" and complimented McVie's songwriting.  Cash Box said it has a "light and bouncy melody" with "some gritty guitar and pounding keyboard work" to "balance the feathery harmonies."  Record World said that "Christine McVie contributes one of her made-for-radio jewels with the irresistible melody & rich vocal harmonies backed by an incessant rhythm track." Steve Morse of The Boston Globe gave the single a positive review, calling "predictably bouncy".

In 2003, Rob Brunner of Entertainment Weekly gave the Tusk album a positive review, noting that it was a "must" and "fascinating mess, full of enough good songs", "Think About Me" included.

In 2010, Alfred Soto of PopMatters described the song as "the unlikeliest of things: a McVie rocker." Soto called it "a near-perfect punk number that snuck in below the radar" and that it was "anchored by her electric piano, (Lindsey) Buckingham's fuzzed-up 'Day Tripper'-esque riff," and "the most sarcastic lyrics of McVie's career," referring to the couplet, "I don't hold you down/Maybe that's why you're around."

Personnel
Lindsey Buckingham – guitars, backing vocals
Christine McVie – lead vocals, keyboards
Stevie Nicks – backing vocals
John McVie – bass guitar
Mick Fleetwood – drums, vibraphone

Charts

References

1980 singles
Fleetwood Mac songs
Warner Records singles
Songs written by Christine McVie
1979 songs